Luciano Loro (born 7 November 1954) is an Italian former professional racing cyclist. He rode in three editions of the Tour de France.

References

External links
 

1954 births
Living people
Italian male cyclists
People from Bassano del Grappa
Cyclists from the Province of Vicenza